The Virtual Observatory India (VO-India) project is a collaboration between two participating institutes. i.e. Inter University Center for Astronomy and Astrophysics (IUCAA) and Persistent Systems Ltd., Pune. This project is supported by the Ministry of Communication and Information Technology, Government of  India.

The VO-India project is a member of International Virtual Observatory Alliance (Virtual Observatory). The project aims at developing free software for astronomy data analysis and visualization.

Objectives

 Undertake research and development for data search and retrieval.
 Develop software for equal and efficient use of the data.
 Enable astronomers and other interested scientists to undertake major scientific projects using the data. 
 Make the technology available for use by other fields, like remote sensing, population studies, which involve large amounts of data.

Tools/Applications

Notable tools developed under the initiative are:

 VOPlot - 2D/3D plotting tool
 Mosaic Service - Astronomy image mosaicing service
 VOStat - Simple UI few selected R routines which will be of interest to people working in astrophysics domain

A complete list of products is available at http://voi.iucaa.in/voi/products.htm
All the tools can be downloaded for free. Source code will be made available on request.

As part of VO-India project, web applications for astronomy proposal submission and evaluation have also been developed for GMRT and IGO observation facilities. Web interface for the data archives for both the facilities are being developed under VO-India initiative.

See also 
 Virtual Observatory, Wiki article about the Virtual Observatory initiative
 Inter-University Centre for Astronomy and Astrophysics
 List of astronomical observatories
 Persistent Systems

External links
VO-India project Home Page
Persistent Systems Home Page (One of the collaborators)
IUCAA Home Page (One of the collaborators)

Virtual observatories
Astronomical observatories in India
Science and technology in Maharashtra
Science and technology in Pune